Nishana is a 1995 Hindi-language Indian action film directed by Raj N. Sippy and produced by Narendra Bajaj, starring Mithun Chakraborty, Rekha, Paresh Rawal, Pankaj Dheer, Raza Murad, Shafi Inamdar and Aparajita.

Plot
The film is a tale of revenge. Police Inspector Suraj whose family is destroyed, kills his enemies as well as those of his love, Bharati.

Cast
Mithun Chakraborty as Police Inspector Suraj	
Rekha as Bharati
Paresh Rawal as Chheda	
Pankaj Dheer as Police Commissioner Mallik	
Raza Murad as Minister Dharamdas		
Shafi Inamdar as Police Inspector Vijay 
Adi Irani as Police Inspector Sachin
Puneet Issar as Durjan
Mangal Dhillon as Corrupt Police Inspector, Durjan Associate
Aparajita Bhushan as Mrs Malik
Gurbachan Singh as Shera's Henchmen

Soundtrack

References

External links
 

1995 films
1990s Hindi-language films
Mithun's Dream Factory films
Films scored by Jatin–Lalit
Films shot in Ooty
Indian action films
Films directed by Raj N. Sippy
1995 action films